Tsum or TSUM may refer to:
 Tsum language, a Tibetic language of Nepal
 TsUM (Almaty), a Kazakh department store
 TsUM (Moscow), a Russian department store
 TZUM (Sofia), a Bulgarian department store

See also 
 Disney Tsum Tsum, a series of toys
 Tzum, a village in the Netherlands